William Barlow may refer to:

Religious figures
William Barlow (bishop of Chichester) (c. 1498–1568), English cleric
William Barlow (bishop of Lincoln) (died 1613), Anglican priest and courtier, served as Bishop of Rochester and Bishop of Lincoln
William Barlow (archdeacon of Salisbury) (died 1625), writer on magnetism, son of the Bishop of Chichester
William Rudesind Barlow (1585–1656), recusant educationalist and rector of the English College in Douai
William Barlow (dean of Peterborough) (1833–1908), Anglican priest

Politicians
Bill Barlow (born 1931), Canadian politician, member of the Legislative Assembly of Ontario
William K. Barlow (born 1936), American politician, member of the Virginia House of Delegates

Others
William V. N. Barlow (1810–1909), American architect based in Albion, New York, namesake of the William V. N. Barlow House
William Henry Barlow (1812–1902), English civil engineer
William Barlow (pioneer) (1822–1904), Oregon pioneer
William Barlow House, Clackamas County, Oregon, former home of the pioneer
William Barlow (vice-chancellor) (1834–1915), lawyer and Vice-Chancellor of the University of Adelaide
William Barlow (geologist) (1845–1934), English geologist
Billy Barlow (1870–1963), Canadian ice hockey player